The 1997 Halifax Blue Sox season was the 102nd season in the club's rugby league history and the second season in the Super League. Coached by John Pendlebury, the Halifax Blue Sox competed in Super League II and finished in 7th place. The club also reached the fifth round of the Challenge Cup.

Table

Squad

References

External links
Halifax Blue Sox - Rugby League Project

Halifax Blue Sox
Halifax R.L.F.C.
English rugby league club seasons